Chris Wanstrath is an American technology entrepreneur. He is the co-founder and former CEO of GitHub, an Internet hosting service for software development and version control using Git, which he created with Tom Preston-Werner in 2008. Before starting GitHub, he worked with CNET on GameSpot. According to Forbes his net worth is estimated to be between $1.8 billion and $2.2 billion and he is listed in America's richest entrepreneurs under 40, as well as Fortunes 40 under 40. He was a speaker at NASA's open source summit. He was named in CNBC's Disruptor 50 list.

Early life
Wanstrath was born on 13 March 1985. He is an Ohio native who briefly commenced an English degree at the University of Cincinnati.

Career
Wanstrath co-founded GitHub in 2008 and served as its CEO from 2014 until October 2018. He stepped down as CEO after finishing a search for his own replacement beginning in early 2017. Microsoft acquired GitHub in June 2018.

References

Year of birth missing (living people)
Living people
American technology chief executives
University of Cincinnati alumni
Industry and corporate fellows
GitHub people